San Mateo or San Mateo de Huánchor is the capital of San Mateo District in Huarochirí Province, Peru.

References

Populated places in the Lima Region